Evelyn Siamupangila (born 26 January 1997) is a Zambian badminton player. She competed at the 2018 Commonwealth Games in Gold Coast.

Personal life 
Her sister Ogar also a professional badminton player.

Achievements

BWF International Challenge/Series (4 titles, 6 runners-up) 
Women's doubles

  BWF International Challenge tournament
  BWF International Series tournament
  BWF Future Series tournament

References

External links 
 

1997 births
Living people
People from Kabwe District
Zambian female badminton players
Badminton players at the 2018 Commonwealth Games
Commonwealth Games competitors for Zambia
Competitors at the 2019 African Games
African Games competitors for Zambia